The Imposter is a 2008 Christian film that was shot in January and February 2008 in and around Burleson, Texas. The movie stars Kevin Max, Kerry Livgren, and Jeff Deyo, and is produced by Jeff Rodgers and Daniel Millican, who also wrote and directed it.

Plot
The Imposter deals with the lifestyle and subsequent breakdown of Christian rock singer Johnny C (Kevin Max), a talented singer addicted to oxycodone.  After his wife and child leave him, he's fired from his band by its leader James (Jeff Deyo). Trying to make it on his own, Johnny gets swindled by a sleazy record producer and beaten up by his drug suppliers. Finally out of options, he travels home to see if his family will take him back.

Cast
 Kevin Max as Johnny C
 Kerry Livgren as Proff
 Jeff Deyo as James
 Tom Wright as Homeless Man
 Arianne Martin as Tara
 Troy Baker as Jerome
 Daniel Millican as Tony
 Meredith Mauldin as Sydney
 Seth Kozak as Man Driving Truck
 Stephanie Mulligan as brain check girl, front desk

Production
The film is a contemporary take on the parable of the Prodigal Son. It is Millican's fourth feature film. He wrote the script during the mid-2007 and began to cast later the same year. Producer Troy Baker was a friend of Kevin Max, formerly of dcTalk, and recommended him to Millican. In addition, Millican, Baker, and producer Jeff Rodgers approached Kerry Livgren and Jeff Deyo to round out the principals.

Veteran Hollywood actor Tom Wright has been in every one of Millican's films. Millican relied heavily on director of photography Ron Gonzalez for the look, locations and production value.

Release 
The movie is released by Pure Flix Entertainment.  The DVD's street date is February 23, 2010.

Related projects
Four songs from Kevin Max's 2005 album The Imposter (album) were used in the film. In 2009 the filmmaker, Serendipitous Films, released an album of songs from the movie entitled Music From The Motion Picture The Imposter.

References 
 Burleson 'stars' in movie
 Review of The Imposter by The Dove Foundation
 Review by The Phantom Tollbooth

External links 
 
 
 Serendipitous Films
 

2008 films
2008 drama films
Films about evangelicalism
2000s English-language films